Bashiran (also Romanized as Bashīrān) is a village in Zirkuh Rural District, Central District, Zirkuh County, South Khorasan Province, Iran. At the 2006 census, its population was 88, in 24 families.

References 

Populated places in Zirkuh County